Hibbertia ulicifolia is a species of flowering plant in the family Dilleniaceae and is endemic to the south coast of Western Australia. It is a shrub with spirally arranged, linear to awl-shaped leaves and golden yellow flowers with nine stamens fused at the bases, all on one side of two densely shortly-hairy carpels.

Description
There are nine stamens, fused at the base on one side of the two densely, shortly-hairy carpels that each contain two ovules. Flowering mostly occurs between September and November.

Taxonomy
This hibbertia was first formally described in 1863 by George Bentham who gave it the name Hibbertia acerosa var. ulicifolia in Flora Australiensis from specimens collected by William Baxter at King George Sound. In 2000, Judith R. Wheeler raised the variety to species status as H. ulicifolia in the journal Nuytsia. The specific epithet (ulicifolia) means "Ulex- (gorse) leaved".

Distribution and habitat
This species mainly grows in heath and on scree slopes in near-coastal areas mainly from Mount Le Grande to Duke of Orleans Bay in the Cape Arid National Park.

Conservation status
Hibbertia hamulosa is classified as "not threatened" by the Western Australian Government Department of Parks and Wildlife.

See also
List of Hibbertia species

References

ulicifolia
Flora of Western Australia
Plants described in 1863
Taxa named by George Bentham